Helen Kelesi won in the final 6–1, 6–0 against Laura Garrone.

Seeds
A champion seed is indicated in bold text while text in italics indicates the round in which that seed was eliminated.

  Helen Kelesi (champion)
  Claudia Porwik (first round)
  Eva Pfaff (second round)
  Barbara Paulus (first round)
  Federica Bonsignori (second round)
  Radka Zrubáková (quarterfinals)
  Christina Singer (second round)
  Laura Garrone (final)

Draw

References
 1988 Taranto Open Draw

Ilva Trophy
1988 WTA Tour